Kavani is a village in the commune of Mamoudzou on Mayotte.

Populated places in Mayotte